Hui Jun (born 1963) is a former international table tennis player from China.

Table tennis career
His two World Championship medals  included a gold medal in the mixed doubles with Geng Lijuan at the 1987 World Table Tennis Championships.

Personal life
Hui was born in Jiangsu in 1963. His wife Li Huifen is also a table tennis player-coach. The couple later moved to Hong Kong. By 2003 Hui had become head coach of the Hong Kong table tennis team.

See also
 List of table tennis players
 List of World Table Tennis Championships medalists

References

External links

1963 births
Living people
Chinese male table tennis players
Asian Games medalists in table tennis
Table tennis players at the 1982 Asian Games
Table tennis players at the 1986 Asian Games
Medalists at the 1982 Asian Games
Medalists at the 1986 Asian Games
Asian Games gold medalists for China
Asian Games silver medalists for China
Asian Games bronze medalists for China
Sportspeople from Wuxi
Table tennis players from Jiangsu